Philip James John Plyming (born 1974) is a British Anglican priest. Since May 2017, he has been the Warden of Cranmer Hall, Durham, an open evangelical Church of England theological college. Previously, from 2006 to 2017, he was the Vicar of Holy Trinity Church, Claygate in the Diocese of Guildford.

Early life and education
Plyming was born in 1974. As a child, he attended an Anglo-Catholic church but "came to a personal faith in 
Christ" while he was at university. He studied at Robinson College, Cambridge, graduating with a Bachelor of Arts (BA) degree in 1996, and then worked as a linguist. In 1998, he entered Cranmer Hall, Durham, an Open Evangelical Anglican theological college, to train for ordained ministry. During this time, he also studied theology at St John's College, Durham, graduating with a first class BA degree in 2000.

Plyming later undertook postgraduate research at the University of Edinburgh, and he completed his Doctor of Philosophy (PhD) degree in 2008. His doctoral thesis was titled "Transforming news: a theoretical and critical analysis of contemporary Christian news handling in the light of the Apostle Paul's Corinthian hardship narratives".

Ordained ministry
Plyming was ordained in the Church of England as a deacon in 2001 and as a priest in 2002. From 2001 to 2006, he served his curacy at Christ Church, Chineham, Hampshire in the Diocese of Winchester; this is a conservative evangelical church that is ecumenical in nature (associated with Baptists, Methodists, and United Reformed Church, in addition to the Church of England). In 2006, he moved to the Diocese of Guildford where he became Vicar of Holy Trinity Church, Claygate, Surrey. Under his leadership, the attendance saw "significant growth" and it can now be classified as "a very large parish church". In 2012, he was also appointed the Area Dean of Emly.

On 20 December 2016, Plyming was announced as the next Warden of Cranmer Hall, Durham. Cranmer Hall is an Open Evangelical Anglican theological college which forms part of St John's College, Durham, and whose degrees are validated by Durham University. He took up the post on 8 May 2017, after a licensing service at St Oswald's Church, Durham.

Plyming was a member of the General Synod of the Church of England from 2009 to 2017. He served as secretary of the Evangelical Group of the General Synod.

Views
Plyming belongs to the Evangelical wing of the Church of England. In August 2016, he signed an open letter that urged the House of Bishops "not to consider any  proposals that fly in the face of the historic understanding of the church as expressed in 'Issues in Human Sexuality' (1991) and Lambeth Resolution 1.10.".

Personal life
Plyming is married to Annabelle. Together they have two sons.

References

1974 births
Living people
21st-century English Anglican priests
Church of England priests
Evangelical Anglican clergy
Alumni of Robinson College, Cambridge
Alumni of St John's College, Durham
Alumni of Cranmer Hall, Durham
Alumni of the University of Edinburgh
Staff of Cranmer Hall, Durham
People from Basingstoke and Deane